Adam Pritzker (born July 17, 1984) is an American entrepreneur. He is currently the chairman and CEO of Assembled Brands, a holding company of fashion and lifestyle consumer brands, and was co-founder and chairman of General Assembly, a private school for professional development. In 2018, General Assembly was sold to The Adecco Group for over $400 million.

Education 
Pritzker attended San Francisco University High School and Columbia University, graduating in 2008 with a Bachelor of Arts in anthropology. He studied with Jeffrey Sachs at Columbia, and went on to work for him at The Earth Institute.

Career 
Pritzker co-founded General Assembly in January 2011 with Jake Schwartz, Brad Hargreaves, and Matt Brimer. Pritzker and his partners started the company as a New York coworking space that offered practical classes on technology, design and entrepreneurship. The 20,000 square foot space was modeled after a college campus, according to Pritzker. He served as the chief creative officer, and helped its expansion to eight other locations globally. He was named to the Inc. (magazine) 30 under 30 list, and the Forbes magazine 30 under 30 list for his work at General Assembly. He left his day-to-day job at the business in 2013 but remained chairman until its sale to The Adecco Group.

In 2013, Pritzker co-founded Assembled Brands, a holding company that includes brands like Khaite (launched in 2016).

In 2021, he was named a trustee of Columbia University.

Political action
In October 2017, Pritzker partnered with Jeffrey Sachs, a development economist at Columbia University, and Daniel Squadron, a former New York state senator, to found Future Now. The group's stated mission was to promote "America's Goals 2030", a set of national policy priorities, by funding state-level political candidates committed to working toward those goals. The organization's policy agenda is based on the U.N.'s Sustainable Development Goals – a global list of priorities approved in 2015 by the 193 U.N. members.

In addition to Future Now, Pritzker and Squadron co-founded the States Project, an advocacy nonprofit organization to win Democratic governing majorities in state legislatures.

Personal 
Pritzker married Sophie McNally in 2016. He is a fourth-generation member of the Pritzker family, son of John Pritzker and grandson of Jay Pritzker. His uncle, Thomas Pritzker, is the executive chairman of Hyatt Hotels Corporation, and his aunt, Gigi Pritzker, is a film producer. He and his family live in Beverly Hills and Montecito, California.

References 

1984 births
Living people
Columbia College (New York) alumni
Pritzker family
American company founders
21st-century American Jews
Businesspeople from San Francisco